Jub Khaleh-ye Sofla (also Romanized as Jūb Khaleh-ye Soflá and Jūbkhaleh-ye Soflá; also known as Jūb Khaleh-ye Pā’īn and Jūy Khaleh Pā’īn) is a village in Komehr Rural District, in the Central District of Sepidan County, Fars Province, Iran. At the 2006 census, its population was 63, in 13 families.

References 

Populated places in Sepidan County